INS Guldar is a  of the Indian Navy.

History
Built at the Gdańsk Shipyard in Poland, INS Guldar was commissioned in December 1985.

References

Kumbhir-class tank landing ships
1985 ships
Ships built in Gdańsk
Naval ships built in Poland for export